The FINA World Junior Synchronised Swimming Championships is an international, synchronized swimming event organized by FINA held every 2 years. It was first held in 1989, and 2012 saw its thirteenth edition.

The event features competition in five artistic swimming event categories (Solo, Duet, Team, Free Combination, Highlight). Free Combination was added to the program beginning in 2002 and Highlight was added to the program starting in the 2022 edition.

For the editions of the Championships between 1989 and 2016, inclusive, the name of the Championships at the time of competition was FINA World Junior Synchronised Swimming Championships, however, following a name change of the sport from synchronised swimming to artistic swimming in 2017, which corresponded with a change in performance evaluation criteria, the name of the Championships at the time of competition was changed to FINA World Junior Artistic Swimming Championships for all subsequent editions (2018 and more recent).

Editions
 
Event codes: Fig= Solo Figures, S= Solo, TS= Technical Solo, FS= Free Solo, D= Duet, TD=Technical Duet, FD= Free Duet, T= Team, TT= Technical Team, FT= Free Team, FC= Free Combination, MDT= Mixed Duet Technical, MDF= Mixed Duet Free, MH= Mixed Highlight, MTS= Man Technical Solo, MFS= Man Free Solo

Medal table
Updated after 2022 Championship.

See also
 FINA World Junior Swimming Championships
 FINA World Junior Diving Championships
 FINA Junior Water Polo World Championships
 FINA World Junior Open Water Swimming Championships

References

 
Recurring sporting events established in 1989
Synchronised swimming competitions
Swimming Synchronised